"You Never Know" is a single by recording artist Stan Walker. The song was released on 26 August 2016.

According to Walker the track has been a long time coming, telling MTV Australia in September 2016 "I've come out of a long creative and technical process with songs I really love and I can't wait to share them!"

A remix was released on 10 December 2016.

Music video
The music video was released on 5 September 2016. It was directed by Shae Sterling, filmed in Los Angeles, choreographed by Kiel Tutin and features dancer Kaili Bright who has previously danced with Justin Bieber.

Formats and track listings
Digital download
"You Never Know" – 3:42

Digital download (remix)
"You Never Know" – 3:26

Charts

References

Stan Walker songs
2016 songs
2016 singles